Apiwat Wongthananon (born 2 February 1994) is a Thai motorcycle racer. He competes in the Asia Road Race ASB1000 Championship aboard a Yamaha YZF-R1. He was champion in the AP250 class of the Asia Road Racing Championship in 2016.

Career statistics

Grand Prix motorcycle racing

By season

Races by year

Supersport World Championship

Races by year
(key) (Races in bold indicate pole position, races in italics indicate fastest lap)

 Season still in progress.

Asia Superbike 1000

Races by year
(key) (Races in bold indicate pole position; races in italics indicate fastest lap)

External links

Apiwat Wongthananon
Living people
1994 births
Moto2 World Championship riders
Moto3 World Championship riders
Apiwat Wongthananon
Apiwat Wongthananon
Supersport World Championship riders